The Gorky Park is a municipal park of culture and recreation in the city of Taganrog, Russia.

History
On June 30, 1806, the first trees were planted for the Taganrog’s "Chemist’s garden" and "botanical garden" by the order of Taganrog’s governor baron Balthasar von Campenhausen In 1895 the project of the new garden’s planning according to new European standards was approved. In 1903, Monument to Peter the Great was placed on Petrovskaya Street in front of the main entrance to the park. 

In 1924, the Peter the Great monument was dismantled and removed. In 1932, the municipal garden became the Park of Culture and Recreation and in 1934 it was named Gorky Park after Maxim Gorky. In 1941-1943, during the Occupation of Taganrog, the City Park was partially destroyed and was used by the occupation forces of Nazi Germany as a cemetery (Der Deutsche Heldenfriedhof).  In 2006, the Gorky Park celebrated its bicentenary anniversary.

Old and modern views of the Gorky Park

External links and references 
 Taganrog Encyclopedia (Энциклопедия Таганрога), 2nd edition, Taganrog, 2003
 История города Таганрога, П.П.Филевский, Москва, 1898

Amusement parks in Russia
Parks in Russia
Buildings and structures completed in 1806
Tourist attractions in Taganrog
Cultural heritage monuments in Taganrog
Cultural heritage monuments of regional significance in Rostov Oblast